Booth Road Celtic Football Club (more commonly known as Booth Road) is a soccer club based in Clondalkin, Dublin, Ireland.

History
Booth Road Celtic Football Club was founded back in June 2001. The club was founded by Mark Maloney, John Finn, Colm Kernan and the late Graham White and Pearse Butler. They play in Clondalkin Leisure Centre and Corkagh Park. They have DDSL, LSL, DWSL and EWFL teams.

Notable former players
  Chris Shields

References

Clondalkin
Association football clubs in the Republic of Ireland